The Calder River is a river in North West Tasmania, Australia, it extends approximately  from the Campbell Ranges near Henrietta before reaching its confluence with the Inglis River near Calder. The river is transversed by the Murchison Highway in its upper reaches. Part of the course of the river is located adjacent to the  Calder River Conservation Area.

The river and the adjacent town was named in honour of James Erskine Calder, the Surveyor General of Tasmania between 1859 and 1870.

See also

References

Further reading
 

Rivers of Tasmania
North West Tasmania
Bass Strait